Tenneti (Telugu: తెన్నేటి) is an family names. It may also refer to:

 Tenneti Hemalata (1935–1997), Indian Woman writer popularly known as Lata
 Tenneti Viswanadham (1896–1979), Indian Politician from Visakhapatnam
 Tenneti Park, Visakhapatnam, India

See also
 Tennet (disambiguation)